The political status of Nagorno-Karabakh has remained unresolved since Azerbaijan's recognition as an independent state in 1991. During the Soviet Union, it had been an ethnic Armenian autonomous oblast of the Azerbaijan Soviet Socialist Republic; however, the disintegration of the USSR was accompanied by the conflict between local Armenians who sought to join Nagorno-Karabakh to Armenia, and local Azerbaijanis who opposed this. The conflict soon boiled over into open warfare in the First Nagorno-Karabakh War and ethnic cleansing, as a result of which Nagorno-Karabakh - as well as 7 surrounding regions of Azerbaijan - came to be occupied by an Armenia-allied de facto state, the Republic of Artsakh. Negotiations took place sporadically over the following decades, during which a ceasefire generally prevailed between Armenia / Artsakh and Azerbaijan (albeit without peacekeeping forces). Turkey and Azerbaijan closed their borders to Armenia and Artsakh, and took other diplomatic steps to isolate them. Meanwhile, the United Nations Security Council, OSCE Minsk Group, and other bodies made various statements and proposed dialogue initiatives; none of them successful. In the 2020 Nagorno-Karabakh war, Azerbaijani forces, backed by Turkey, entered the Artsakh-held territories and retook the southern half of the region, including Shusha. Armenia was forced to concede additional territories in order to preserve Stepanakert and the northern half of the Republic of Artsakh under local Armenian control (and protected by Russian peacekeepers). The political status of this reduced region was not specified in the agreement, and remains unresolved.

Political ties with Armenia 
In the case of Chiragov and others v. Armenia, the European Court of Human Rights decided that "the Republic of Armenia, from the early days of the Nagorno-Karabakh conflict, has had a significant and decisive influence over the “NKR”, that the two entities are highly integrated in virtually all important matters and that this situation persists to this day."

According to Human Rights Watch, "from the beginning of the Karabakh conflict, Armenia provided aid, weapons, and volunteers. Armenian involvement in Karabakh escalated after a December 1993 Azerbaijani offensive. The Republic of Armenia began sending conscripts and regular Army and Interior Ministry troops to fight in Karabakh."

Positions and statements

The sovereign status of the Republic of Artsakh is not recognized by any United Nations member state (including Armenia), but has been recognized by Transnistria, Abkhazia and South Ossetia; Transnistria is not recognized by any UN member state, while the latter two have international recognition from several UN member states. Armenia is currently in an ongoing negotiation with Artsakh, where the end goal is either Artsakh independence recognition or Artsakh integration with Armenia, whatever the people of Artsakh would prefer. Three UN Security Council Resolutions (853, 874, and 884) and United Nations General Assembly resolutions 49/13 and 57/298 refer to Nagorno-Karabakh as a region of Azerbaijan. None of these resolutions were passed under Chapter VII (Action with Respect to Threats to the Peace, Breaches of the Peace, and Acts of Aggression) of the Charter. Certain politicians and legal scholars have expressed the view that resolutions are only legally binding if they are made under Chapter VII of the Charter. However, it does not mean that binding force of the UN Security Council Resolutions (822, 853, 874, and 884) is called into question.The language of these four Resolutions indicates that they are "not mere recommendations or exhortations, but legally binding decisions."  According to a report prepared by British parliamentarian and rapporteur David Atkinson, presented to Political Affairs Committee of the Parliamentary Assembly of the Council of Europe (PACE), "the borders of Azerbaijan were internationally recognised at the time of the country being recognised as independent state in 1991," and "the territory of Azerbaijan included the Nagorno-Karabakh region."

The Resolution #1416, adopted by PACE in 2005, stated that "Considerable parts of the territory of Azerbaijan are still occupied by Armenian forces, still in control of the Nagorno-Karabakh region." The resolution further stated: "The Assembly reiterates that the occupation of foreign territory by a member state constitutes a grave violation of that state’s obligations as a member of the Council of Europe and reaffirms the right of displaced persons from the area of conflict to return to their homes safely and with dignity." Recalling the Resolutions 822, 853, 874, and 884 (all 1993) of the UN Security Council, PACE urged "the parties concerned to comply with them, in particular by refraining from any armed hostilities and by withdrawing military forces from any occupied territories." The resolution also called on "the Government of Azerbaijan to establish contact, without preconditions, with the political representatives of both communities from the Nagorno-Karabakh region regarding the future status of the region."

The Council of Europe called on the Nagorno-Karabakh de facto authorities to refrain from staging one-sided "local self-government elections" in Nagorno-Karabakh. "These so-called 'elections' cannot be legitimate," stressed Council of Europe Committee of Ministers' Chairman and Liechtenstein Foreign Minister Ernst Walch, Parliamentary Assembly President Lord Russell-Johnston and Secretary General Walter Schwimmer. They recalled that following the 1991–1994 armed conflict between Armenia and Azerbaijan, a substantial part of the region's population was forced to flee their homes and are still living as displaced persons in those countries or as refugees abroad. This position was reiterated by Walter Schwimmer, Secretary General of the Council of Europe on 4 August 2004 with regard to the next elections, staged in the province, and by the Chair of the Council of Europe’s Committee of Ministers on 12 July 2007 with regard to the presidential elections organised in Nagorno-Karabakh. On 21 May 2010 Catherine Ashton, High Representative of the European Union for Foreign Affairs and Security Policy, stated: "I would like to recall that the European Union does not recognise the constitutional and legal framework within which the "parliamentary elections" in Nagorno Karabakh will be held this Sunday. This event should not prejudice the peaceful settlement of the Nagorno-Karabakh conflict". OSCE Minsk Group Co-Chairs stated that "Although the Co-Chairs understand the need for the de facto authorities in NK to try to organize democratically the public life of their population with such a procedure, they underscore again that Nagorno-Karabakh is not recognized as an independent and sovereign state by any of their three countries, nor by any other country, including Armenia. The Co-Chairs consider that this procedure should not preempt the determination of the final legal status of Nagorno-Karabakh in the broader framework of the peaceful settlement of the Nagorno-Karabakh conflict".

In January 2016, the PACE adopted the Resolution #2085 entitled "Inhabitants of frontier regions of Azerbaijan are deliberately deprived of water" which stated that "the occupation by Armenia of Nagorno-Karabakh and other adjacent areas of Azerbaijan creates similar humanitarian and environmental problems for the citizens of Azerbaijan living in the Lower Karabakh valley". The resolution also requested "the immediate withdrawal of Armenian armed forces from the region" and "the Armenian authorities to cease using water resources as tools of political influence or an
instrument of pressure".

The European Union declared that "The European Union confirms its support for the territorial integrity of Azerbaijan, and recalls that it does not recognise the independence of Nagorno Karabakh. The European Union cannot consider legitimate the 'presidential elections' that were scheduled to take place on 11 August 2002 in Nagorno Karabakh". The European Union reiterated this position with regard to the presidential elections, held in the region in 2007.

The US Department of State's annual Country Reports on Human Rights Practices – 2006, released on 6 March 2007 stated that "Armenia continues to occupy the Azerbaijani territory of Nagorno-Karabakh and seven surrounding Azerbaijani territories. During the year incidents along the militarized line of contact separating the sides again resulted in numerous casualties on both sides".

A background paper prepared by the Directorate General of Political Affairs of the Council of Europe for the seminar "Youth and Conflict Resolution" (Strasbourg, 31 March – 2 April 2003) states, "The Armenian side maintains that the N-K independence referendum was conducted in accordance with the USSR law on the 'Procedure for Solving Issues of Secession of a Soviet Republic from the USSR' of 3 April 1990. Article 3 of this law provided autonomous regions within the Soviet republics with the right to determine independently, by referendum, whether they wished to remain within the USSR or join the republic seceding from the USSR. It would however seem that according to this law N-K would have the choice of two options – to remain within the USSR or to join independent Azerbaijan; N-K independence does not seem possible".

According to the article in "The Journal of Conflict Resolution", the Armenian side "justified its claim by Article 70 of the Soviet Constitution, which affirms the right to self-determination of the peoples of the USSR. In fact, this recognition of the principle of self-determination is only part of a general declaratory statement about the nature of the Soviet federation: “The Union of Soviet Socialist Republics is an integral, federal, multi-national state formed on the principle of socialist federalism as a result of the free self-determination of nations and the voluntary association of equal Soviet Socialist Republics. The USSR embodies the state unity of the Soviet people and draws all its nations and nationalities together for the purpose of jointly building communism.” There is no mechanism, other than the right of the union republics to secede (Article 72 of the constitution), through which to express the right of self-determination".

The actual declaration of establishment of the Nagorno Karabakh Republic, issued on 2 September 1991, states that the republic is proclaimed pursuant to the USSR law of secession, and that it "enjoys the authorities given to Republics by the USSR Constitution and legislation and reserves the right to decide independently the issue of its state-legal status based on political consultations and negotiations with the leadership of Union and Republics." The Declaration further states that "the USSR Constitution and legislation, as well as other laws currently in force, which do not contradict the goals and principles of this Declaration and peculiarities of the Republic apply on the territory of the Nagorno Karabakh Republic, until the NKR Constitution and laws are adopted."

However, the Ministry of Foreign Affairs of Azerbaijan states that "according to this Law, in a Union republic containing autonomous republics, autonomous provinces and autonomous regions, the referendum had to be held separately in each autonomous unit, the people of which retained the right to decide independently the question of staying in the USSR or in the seceding Union republic, as well as to raise the question of their own state-legal status. It is important to emphasize that the secession of a Union republic from the USSR could be regarded valid only after the fulfillment of complicated and multi-staged procedure and, finally, the adoption of the relevant decision by the Congress of the USSR People's Deputies. However, until the Soviet Union ceased to exist as international person, the mentioned Law was without legal effect, since no Union republic, including Azerbaijan and Armenia, had used the procedure for secession stipulated in it".

The OSCE Minsk Group has allowed the Nagorno-Karabakh Republic (referring to it as the "leadership of Nagorny Karabakh"), as well as Armenia and Azerbaijan, to participate in the peace process as "parties to the conflict," and the Azerbaijani community of the region – as an "interested party". The Chairman of the CSCE Minsk Conference mentioned that "the terms 'party to the conflict' and 'leadership of Nagorny Karabakh' do not imply recognition of any diplomatic or political status under domestic or international law". The Azerbaijani community is led by Tural Ganjaliyev, the head of the executive power of Shusha region.

At a 2007 press conference in Yerevan, Yuri Merzlyakov, the OSCE Minsk Group Russian Co-Chair stated, "At the press conference in Baku, I underlined that Nagorno Karabakh was a part of Azerbaijani SSR and not of Azerbaijan. I perfectly know that till 1917 Nagorno Karabakh was a part of the Russian Empire. The history is necessary in order to settle conflicts, but it is necessary to proceed from international law". Meanwhile, on 10 June 2007 after US-Azerbaijani security consultations in Washington D.C. with Azerbaijani Deputy Foreign Minister Araz Azimov, Deputy Assistant Secretary of US Department of State, US Co-Chairman of OSCE Minsk group Matthew Bryza in a joint press conference announced: "In the circles of international law there is no universal formula for the supremacy of territorial integrity over the right of self-determination of people.".

On 14 March 2008, the United Nations General Assembly passed a non-binding resolution by a vote of 39 to 7, with 100 abstentions, reaffirming Azerbaijan's territorial integrity, expressing support for that country's internationally recognized borders and demanding the immediate withdrawal of all Armenian forces from all occupied territories there. The resolution was supported mainly by members of the OIC and GUAM, both of which Azerbaijan is a member, as well as other nations facing breakaway regions. The resolution was opposed by all three co-chairs of the OSCE Minsk Group.

Armenia 
Armenia does not officially recognize the sovereign status of Artsakh. Armenia's government has stated that it would unilaterally recognize Artsakh only as an option of last resort to be used only if Azerbaijan resorted to military activity. In 2010, President Armen Sarkissian said "We wanted for Artsakh’s independence to be recognized as a result of the negotiations, and only after that Armenia would recognize it. At the same time, if the war goes on and there is no chance for the negotiations to resume, Armenia will most probably will have no choice but to recognize [Artsakh]...We believe that there is no military solution to this problem." When the Second Nagorno-Karabakh War started, Prime Minister Pashinyan stated that the Armenian government was considering unilaterally recognizing the independence of Nagorno-Karabach. Responding to instances where Armenian farmers in Nagorno-Karabakh were killed or shot by Azerbaijani forces, Pashinyan tweeted “Azerbaijan calls Armenians of Nagorno-Karabakh ‘our citizens’ and, at the same time, shoots at them while they are doing agricultural work."

Azerbaijan 
Azerbaijan does not officially recognize the sovereign status of Artsakh; however, in a 2016 interview, current Azerbaijani President Aliyev referred to “an autonomous republic” of Nagorno-Karabakh. This was the first time that an Azerbaijani leader had used the word "republic" to refer to the Armenian-controlled enclave. The U.S. Co-Chair of the OSCE Minsk Group praised these remarks as move to open "discussions on status."

European Parliament 
On 20 May 2010, the European Parliament adopted a resolution "on the need for an EU strategy for the South Caucasus", which states that EU must pursue a strategy to promote stability, prosperity and conflict resolution in the South Caucasus.  The resolution "calls on the parties to intensify their peace talk efforts for the purpose of a settlement in the coming months, to show a more constructive attitude and to abandon preferences to perpetuate the status quo created by force and with no international legitimacy, creating in this way instability and prolonging the suffering of the war-affected populations; condemns the idea of a military solution and the heavy consequences of military force already used, and calls on both parties to avoid any further breaches of the 1994 ceasefire". The resolution also calls for withdrawal of Armenian forces from all occupied territories of Azerbaijan, accompanied by deployment of international forces to be organised with respect of the UN Charter in order to provide the necessary security guarantees in a period of transition,  which will ensure the security of the population of Nagorno-Karabakh and allow the displaced persons to return to their homes and further conflicts caused by homelessness to be prevented; and states that the EU believes that the position according to which Nagorno-Karabakh includes all occupied Azerbaijani lands surrounding Nagorno-Karabakh should rapidly be abandoned. It also notes "that an interim status for Nagorno-Karabakh could offer a solution until the final status is determined and that it could create a transitional framework for peaceful coexistence and cooperation of Armenian and Azerbaijani populations in the region."

In October 2013, the European Parliament adopted the Resolution on the European Neighbourhood Policy in which it is stated that the occupation by one country of the Eastern Partnership (which includes Armenia and Azerbaijan) of the territory of another "violates the fundamental principles and objectives of the Eastern Partnership and that the resolution of the Nagorno-Karabakh conflict should comply with UN Security Council resolutions 822, 853, 874 and 884 of 1993 and the Organisation for Security and Cooperation in Europe (OSCE) Minsk Group Basic Principles, enshrined in the L’Aquila joint statement of 10 July 2009".  This same document also states that "Parliament fully subscribes to the principles of sovereignty, territorial integrity and the right to self-determination of nations;"

On 15 November 2017, the European Parliament adopted a resolution "reaffirming its support to the OSCE Minsk Group co-chairs' efforts to solve the Nagorno-Karabakh conflict and to their 2009 Basic Principles, which include territorial integrity, self-determination and the non-use of force".

OSCE Minsk Group 
On 26 June 2010, the presidents of the OSCE Minsk Group's Co-Chair countries, France, the Russian Federation, and the United States of America made a joint statement, reaffirming their "commitment to support the leaders of Armenia and Azerbaijan as they finalize the Basic Principles for the peaceful settlement of the Nagorno-Karabakh conflict".

Independence recognition efforts

Non-UN member states

U.S. states and communities

Before California recognized Nagorno-Karabakh in May 2014, three places within the state had already recognized it:
 Fresno County (April 2013)
 Highland (November 2013)
 Los Angeles (January 2014)

In addition, Highland is twinned with Lachin and Montebello is twinned with Stepanakert.

On 20 April 2016, the city of Honolulu, Hawaii recognized Artsakh. On 21 September 2016, the city of Denver, Colorado recognized the independence of Artsakh.

In 2020, the Artsakh Republic was recognized by:

 Fitchburg, Massachusetts
 Fort Lee Borough
 Glendale, California
 Fowler
 Englewood Cliffs, New Jersey
 Clark County, Nevada
 Ridgefield, New Jersey
 Cliffside Park, New Jersey
 Orange County
In 2021, the Artsakh Republic was recognized by:
 Twin Falls, Idaho
 West Hollywood
 Burbank, California
 Oxford, Ohio
 Rancho Cordova, California

Australia
In October 2012, the Australian state of New South Wales recognized Nagorno-Karabakh however, the Australian Foreign Minister reaffirmed in November 2015 that the federal government of the Commonwealth of Australia does not, and supports Azerbaijan's claim to the state. In 2017, The Australian Greens announced that they recognize the Republic of Artsakh (Nagorno-Karabakh).

In October 2020, the New South Wales Legislative Assembly recognized Artsakh. On 9 November 2020, the city of Willoughby recognized the independence of Artsakh.

In February 2021, the state of South Australia recognized the independence of Artsakh.

Canada 
Following the outbreak of the 2020 Nagorno-Karabakh war, Senator Leo Housakos called for a motion for Canada to recognize Nagorno-Karabakh as an independent country.

On 5 November 2020, the city of Laval in Quebec recognized the independence of Artsakh.

On 8 December 2020, the Senate of Canada rejected a motion on "condemning the Azerbaijani-Turkish aggression" and recognizing the independence of Artsakh.

Czech Republic 
On 27 October 2020, the municipal district of Řeporyje, Czech Republic recognized the independence of Artsakh.

France 

Independence of Artsakh is recognized by the cities of Alfortville, Limonest, and Vienne. A Bill on recognition of the Artsakh Republic was submitted to the French National Assembly on 14 October 2020.

On 6 November 2020, the Assembly of Corsica adopted a resolution on the recognition of the Artsakh Republic.

On 18 November 2020, the Council of Paris, the legislative body governing Paris, recognized the independence of Artsakh and called on the French government to follow.

On 21 November 2020, the city council of Saint-Étienne recognized the independence of Artsakh, while on the same date, the Aix-Marseille-Provence Metropolis called for the French government to recognize Artsakh. On 24 November 2020, the city of Décines-Charpieu and the Grenoble-Alpes Métropole both called for the recognition of Artsakh by the French government.

On 25 November 2020, the French Senate adopted a resolution calling for recognition of the independence of Artsakh. However, following the resolution adopted by France's Senate, a French Foreign Ministry spokesperson stated “France does not recognize the self-proclaimed Nagorno-Karabakh Republic.”

On 1 December 2020, the Asnières-sur-Seine and Métropole Nice Côte d'Azur municipal council's called on the French Government to recognize Artsakh.

On 3 December 2020, the National Assembly of France adopted a resolution urging the French Government to recognize Artsakh.

Between 17 and 21 December 2020, the commune of Issy-les-Moulineaux, the department of Hauts-de-Seine, and the cities of Sarcelles, Clamart, and Montpellier adopted resolutions calling for the recognition of Artsakh. Meanwhile, the city of Valence recognized Artsakh's independence.

Guatemala 
The City Hall of Sayaxché, Guatemala has officially recognized the right to self-determination of the Armenians of Artsakh and is supporting the creation of a free and sovereign state.

Italy 
On 15 October 2020, the Italian city of Milan became the first ever large European city to recognize the Republic of Artsakh. Recognitions by Palermo, Asolo, Cerchiara di Calabria, and the Italian region of Lombardy followed within a fortnight. On 4 November 2020, the city of Campobasso recognized Artsakh. The following day, similar motions recognizing Artsakh was passed by the municipalities of Bleggio Superiore and Drena.

On 18 November 2020, the city of Viareggio recognized Artsakh's independence. On 19 November 2020, Aprilia and Pisa recognized the independence of Artsakh. On 25 November 2020, the city of Schio recognized the independence of Artsakh.

On 26 November 2020, the municipality of San Giorgio di Nogaro recognized the independence of Artsakh. On 2 December 2020, the municipality of Malo announced its recognition of Artsakh, followed by the towns of Ariccia on 11 December 2020 and San Pietro Vernotico on 31 December 2020. 

On 2 April 2021, the municipality of San Vito dei Normanni recognized the independence of Artsakh.

On 26 May 2021, the Metropolitan City of Reggio Calabria also recognized the Republic of Artsakh.

Spain 
In September 2014, the Basque parliament adopted a motion supporting Nagorno-Karabakh's right to self-determination.

On 22 October 2020, the Parliament of Catalonia adopted a motion supporting the Nagorno-Karabakh ceasefire and the recognition of the Artsakh Republic.

On 30 October 2020, the Catalan city of Amposta recognized the independence of Artsakh.

On 6 November 2020, the city of Berga in Catalonia recognized the independence of Artsakh. On 21 December 2020, Santa Pau recognized the sovereignty of Artsakh.

United Kingdom 
On 25 November 2020, the Derby City Council unanimously passed a resolution to recognize the independence of the Republic of Artsakh. The city of Derby thus becoming the first city in the United Kingdom to adopt such a resolution.

Uruguay 
On 13 November 2020, the legislature of Uruguay's Montevideo Department unanimously recognized the independence of the Republic of Artsakh.

See also 

 Armenian-occupied territories surrounding Nagorno-Karabakh
 Community for Democracy and Rights of Nations
 Foreign relations of Artsakh
 List of representative offices of Artsakh
 Madrid Principles
 Republic of Artsakh
 Visa policy of Artsakh

References

External links 
 Government of the Nagorno-Karabakh Republic